The 1947 Copa del Generalísimo was the 45th staging of the Copa del Rey, the Spanish football cup competition.

The competition began on 20 April 1947 and ended on 22 June 1947 with the final.

First round

|}
Tiebreaker

|}
Bye: Club Atlético de Bilbao, CF Barcelona, Real Santander SD, CD Málaga

Round of 16

|}
Tiebreaker

|}

Quarter-finals

|}

Semi-finals

|}

Final

|}

External links
 rsssf.com
 linguasport.com

Copa del Rey seasons
1946–47 in Spanish football